Forkhill Peadar Ó Doirnín Gaelic Athletic Club is a Gaelic Athletic Association club within Armagh GAA. It is based in the village of Forkhill in south Armagh, Northern Ireland, on the border with County Louth, and is named in honour of the 18th-century Airgíalla poet Peadar Ó Doirnín. The club is one of the oldest in the county; having been founded in 1888, it marked its 125th anniversary in 2013.

It currently plays Gaelic football at Intermediate level.

History
Four Forkhill players were members of the Armagh squad which won the All-Ireland Junior Football Championship in 1926.

Forkhill Senior men reached Division 1A for the first time in club history in 2015 and spent 2 years in Armagh club footballs top tier before relegation every year ending up in Junior league.

In the same year of 2015 Forkhill senior ladies captured the Armagh junior championship.

Forkhill witnessed partial success at underage level in 2019 with the under 14 side reaching the championship final but were defeated. The under 16 side captured division 2 league glory defeating Mullaghabawn.

In 2020 Forkhill seniors captured the junior championship defeating Bellek 3–10 to 1–10 in the final and doing so captured there first championship glory at senior level in 39 years.

Notable players

Stephen Sheridan, Armagh county team (Armagh County Player of the Year 2017)
Patrick Burns, Armagh county team (Armagh County Player of the Year 2018)
Jemar Hall, Armagh county team

Honours
 Armagh Senior Football Championship (1)
 1928
 Armagh Junior Football Championship (2)
 1981,2020

References

External links 
 Club website
 Forkhill page on Armagh GAA website

Gaelic games clubs in County Armagh
Gaelic football clubs in County Armagh